Charan Badi Amolak Cheej (IAST: Cāraṇa Baḍī Amolaka Cīja; Devnagari: चारण बड़ी अमोलक चीज) is a 19th-century short Dingal (Marwari) poem written by Maharaja Man Singh of Marwar. The poem is divided into 5 stanzas and praises the Charanas extolling their virtues and importance in the royal courts of medieval India.

Lyrics

Further reading 

 Cāraṇa baḍī amolaka cīja (in Hindi). Cāraṇa Sāhitya Śodha Saṃsthāna. 1989.

References 

Poems
Indian poems
Dingal poems
Rajasthani literature
19th-century poems